Kokkadavil is a small area located at Tharuvana in Vellamunda panchayat, Wayanad district, in the state of Kerala, India.

See also 
 Tharuvana
 Vellamunda
 Mananthavady

References 

Villages in Wayanad district